Josef Schraner (born 5 April 1929) is a Swiss former cyclist. He competed in the individual and team road race events at the 1952 Summer Olympics.

References

External links
 

1929 births
Possibly living people
People from Zurzach District
Swiss male cyclists
Olympic cyclists of Switzerland
Cyclists at the 1952 Summer Olympics
Sportspeople from Aargau